Maddie's Do You Know? (originally known as simply Do You Know? for its first two series) is a British children's television series, produced by Banijay Group subsidiary 7 Wonder for the BBC channel CBeebies, and presented by Maddie Moate. A third series aired in 2019, followed by a fourth in April 2020 running until September 2020. Maddie's Do You Know? is also available on BBC iPlayer for over a year.

Overview
Maddie's Do You Know? is a series for young children in which sees Maddie explores the workings of everyday objects, by asking how they are made or how they work? She uses animations and cameras in this series.

Series overview
<onlyinclude>

Episodes

Series 1 (2016)

Series 2 (2018)

Series 3 (2019)

Series 4 (2020)

Series 5 (2020-2021)

Spin-off series
Maddie, the Zoo and You was broadcast in 2020, and featured five episodes. It was followed by a sequel series of five episodes in 2021, Maddie, Space and You another five episode sequel series was in Maddie the Plants and you followed by Maddie, the Home and You. Maddie, the Zoo and You is also available on BBC iPlayer for over a year.

References

External links 
 
 

2016 British television series debuts
2010s British children's television series
2010s British documentary television series
BBC children's television shows
BBC television documentaries
British preschool education television series
CBeebies
Documentary television series about industry
English-language television shows
Television series by Banijay